XHXK-FM is a radio station on 100.1 FM in Poza Rica, Veracruz, owned and operated by Radio Fórmula.

History
XEXK-AM 1080 received its concession on January 20, 1972. It was owned by Radio Poza Rica, S.A. and operated as a 250-watt daytimer. In 1978, 1986 and 1987, technical changes were approved boosting the station to 500 watts (in 1978), adding a 100-watt nighttime service (in 1986) and increasing that to 250 watts (in 1987). It further boosted power to 10,000 watts in 1994 and was sold to Radio Fórmula in 2000.

XEXK was authorized to move to FM in November 2010 and soon after moved to its own transmitter site, separate from Radiorama Poza Rica.

References

Radio stations in Veracruz
Radio Fórmula